St. Charles Seminary is a former American Catholic seminary, founded by the Missionaries of the Precious Blood in 1861 in Carthagena, Ohio. The seminary closed in 1969 and is now a retirement center for clergy and lay people.  The seminary, chapel, and five other buildings were added to the National Register of Historic Places in 1979.

History
The first buildings on the site of Saint Charles Seminary were the former buildings of the Emlen Institute.  The institute was a boarding school for African-American youth, begun with a bequest from Samuel Emline, Jr., a Quaker.  The institute sold its Ohio property and moved to Pennsylvania in 1857.

The Missionaries of the Precious Blood had arrived in Ohio in 1844 to begin serving German-speaking settlers living there. In 1861 they purchased 200 acres of land and the former Emlen Institute to serve as a seminary for the candidates to their religious congregation, which they then placed under the patronage of St. Charles Borromeo.

The current seminary building was constructed over a six-year period in the 1920s.  It is a three-story building with a 371-foot frontage, flanked by two 140-foot wings. The chapel was built by the sons of Ohio steepled-church designer Anton De Curtins.

The seminary closed in 1969 as a consequence of declining enrollment.  Theology students for the congregation now study at Catholic Theological Union in Chicago.

Present day
In order to accommodate the retiring priests and Religious Brothers of the congregation, the former seminary was converted into the St. Charles Center, a retirement home for them. As this need peaked in 1980s and 1990s, the center became converted into a senior living center for lay people as well.

References

Catholic Church in Ohio
Catholic seminaries in the United States
Seminaries and theological colleges in Ohio
1861 establishments in Ohio
Educational institutions established in 1861
Educational institutions disestablished in 1969
Defunct Catholic universities and colleges in the United States
Defunct private universities and colleges in Ohio
National Register of Historic Places in Mercer County, Ohio
Housing for the elderly in the United States
Missionaries of the Precious Blood